Košarkaški Klub Vinkovci ("Vinkovci Basketball Club") is a Croatian basketball team from Vinkovci.

History 
KK Vinkovci was founded on October 8, 1963.  In its history, the club changed its name several times - KK Vinkovci, KK Dinamo Vinkovci, KK Telecomp Vinkovci -, and still exists under the original name KK Vinkovci. The first name was changed to Dinamo, then in TELECOMP, after The club, which financially was closely linked to the failed bank from Vinkovci, basketball is in the Bosutu organized game under the original name.  The club is playing its home games in the Basketball hall "Lenije" in Vinkovci. The biggest success of the club realized the nineties of the 20th century when the club played very well and recorded historical successes.

Notable players 
  Mario Kasun
  Nino Primorac
  Ivan Papac
  Sanjin Kalaica

Basketball teams in Croatia
Basketball teams established in 1963
Basketball teams in Yugoslavia